Ola, is the brand name used by the affiliates owned by Libya Oil Holdings and previously known as Tamoil Africa. Ola has over 3000 branches in 17 countries across Africa, including Egypt, Senegal, Ivory Coast, Cameroon, Gabon, Kenya, Mali, Burkina Faso, Niger, Chad, Eritrea, Uganda, Nigeria, Mauritius, Réunion, Morocco, Tunisia, Ethiopia, and Sudan.

Services and products 

 Fuels 
 Lubricants 
 LPG 
 Industrial & wholesale 
 Supply & trading 
 Retail 
 Aviation 
 Marine 
 Lubricants

Expansion & oil exploration 

In 2008, OiLibya entered the Ethiopian market acquiring 100% of Shell's Ethiopia and Djibouti petroleum retail business. The amount of money spent by Oilibya to close the deal was unrevealed. Oilibya has bought many other retail petroleum dealers in Africa, including taking over ExxonMobil's business in Kenya.

Bahru said at the time the sale was consistent with Shell's global strategy to focus on oil exploration and get out of retail business.

Subsidiaries and affiliates of OiLibya 

OiLibya has 18 subsidiaries

Main consolidated subsidiaries

Burkina Faso
Cameroon
Chad
Egypt
Eritrea
Ethiopia
Gabon
Kenya
Mali
Morocco
Niger
Réunion
Senegal
Sudan
Tunisia
Uganda

2011 Libyan civil war 

In February 2011, some African countries began to express concerns as to how the 2011 Libyan civil war might affect OiLibya and its outlets across the region. Of particular concern were the huge debts racked up by Libya's key enterprises.

See also 

 Libya Oil Holdings

References

Oil and gas companies of Libya
Libyan brands